Kalalè is a town, arrondissement, and commune in the Borgou Department of eastern Benin.

References

Communes of Benin
Populated places in Benin